Rose Hill is an unincorporated community in Johnson County, in the U.S. state of Missouri.

History
Rose Hill was platted in 1842, and named for the wild roses near the elevated town site. A post office called Rose Hill was established in 1866, and remained in operation until 1885. A variant name was "Big Creek".

References

Unincorporated communities in Johnson County, Missouri
Unincorporated communities in Missouri